
Aisthorpe is a small village and civil parish in the West Lindsey district of Lincolnshire, England. Aisthorpe is recorded as Æstorp in 1086, probably meaning "the secondary settlement to the east" from the Old English east and Old Danish thorp.

It is situated between Scampton and Brattleby on the B1398, a small back road to the west of, and parallel to, the A15 northern section of Ermine Street out of Lincoln.

Aisthorpe, or East Thorpe, is listed in the 1086 Domesday Book as consisting of 12 households.

The parish church is a Grade II listed building dedicated to Saint Peter and was built in 1867 by T. C. Hine of Nottingham.

Aisthorpe Hall is a Grade II listed country house dating from the 17th century, with later additions. The Hall also has an 18th-century Grade II listed stable block.

Population

References

External links
 
 
 Aerial view of Aisthorpe

Villages in Lincolnshire
Civil parishes in Lincolnshire
West Lindsey District